The Third Degree  is a 1926 American silent romance film produced and distributed by Warner Bros. and directed by Michael Curtiz, in his first American film, Starring Dolores Costello, it is based on the hit 1909 play of the same name  written by Charles Klein that starred Helen Ware.

Cast

Box Office
According to Warner Bros records The Third Degree earned $269,000 domestically and $144,000 foreign.

Preservation status
A copy of this film is held by the Library of Congress. Also a 16mm print is in the Wisconsin Center for Film and Theater Research.

References

External links

 
Lantern slide to The Third Degree
Period advertisement

1926 films
Films directed by Michael Curtiz
American silent feature films
American black-and-white films
Warner Bros. films
1920s romance films
American romance films
1920s American films